Daddy or Mommy  is a 2015 French comedy film directed by Martin Bourboulon. A sequel was made a year later, and it was the subject of both an Italian (Mom or Dad?) and a German remake in 2017, as well as a Spanish remake (You Keep the Kids!) in 2021.

Cast 
 Marina Foïs as Florence Leroy  
 Laurent Lafitte as Vincent Leroy  
 Alexandre Desrousseaux as Mathias Leroy  
 Anna Lemarchand as Emma Leroy  
 Achille Potier as Julien Leroy 
 Judith El Zein as Virginie 
 Michaël Abiteboul as Paul 
 Vanessa Guide as Marion 
 Michel Vuillermoz as Coutine
 Anne Le Ny as The judge
 Yves Verhoeven as Henri
 Sloan-Perry Ambassa as The Hostess
 Yannick Choirat as Xavier

Box office 
The film earned $3.85 million in its opening weekend in France.

References

External links 
 

2015 films
2015 comedy films
2010s French-language films
French comedy films
Pathé films
Films about divorce
2010s French films